The 2013 Banja Luka Challenger was a professional tennis tournament played on clay courts. It was the twelfth edition of the tournament which was part of the 2013 ATP Challenger Tour. It took place in Banja Luka, Bosnia and Herzegovina from 7 to 15 September 2013.

Singles main draw entrants

Seeds

 1 Rankings are as of August 26, 2013.

Other entrants
The following players received wildcards into the singles main draw:
  Laslo Đere
  Djordje Djokovic
  Peđa Krstin
  Mike Urbanija

The following players received entry from the qualifying draw:
  Marin Bradarić
  Piotr Gadomski
  Ante Pavić
  Danilo Petrović

The following players received entry as a lucky losers:
  Ivan Bjelica

Champions

Singles

 Aljaž Bedene def.  Diego Schwartzman 6–3, 6–4

Doubles

 Marin Draganja /  Nikola Mektić def.  Dominik Meffert /  Oleksandr Nedovyesov 6–4, 3–6, [10–6]

External links
Official Website

Banja Luka Challenger
Banja Luka Challenger
2013 in Bosnia and Herzegovina sport
September 2013 sports events in Europe